Sehrish Khan (born 10 July 1959) is a Pakistani TV actress who worked in TV plays mostly during the 1980s and 1990s. She is known for her roles in TV dramas Samundar (1983), Andhera Ujala (1984), and Ainak Wala Jin (1993).

Career
Sehrish started her acting career in 1979 at PTV Lahore. Her first notable drama was Amjad Islam Amjad's Samundar (1983). During 1984 - 1985, she gave several guest appearances in the TV serial Andhera Ujala along with the regular cast. Her role as Farkhanda in the children's fictional play Ainak Wala Jin was an important milestone in her career. The play was aired on PTV in 1993-1996. Madaar (1990) and Rait (1992) were among her other notable TV dramas. In 1995, she starred in the drama Master Barket Masih, based on the issues of educational system. In the late 1990s, she took a break and then came back to television in 2009.

In 2012, she appeared in the telefilm Des Mein Nikla Chand which was aired on PTV. In 2015, she appeared in Geo TV's drama Tera Mera Rishta as Aliya. Her other telefilm was Bhaylan (2016), which was written by Attaullah Ali and produced by Shaukat Chingizi.

Personal life
In the late 1990s, she married a businessman and settled abroad in Los Angeles.

Filmography

Television series

Telefilm

References

External links
 

1959 births
20th-century Pakistani actresses
Living people
Pakistani television actresses
21st-century Pakistani actresses